Felipe dos Santos or Felipe Santos may refer to:

Felipe dos Santos (decathlete) (Felipe Vinícius dos Santos, born 1994), Brazilian decathlete
Felipe Bardi dos Santos (born 1998), Brazilian sprinter 
Filipe dos Santos (1896–1941), Portuguese footballer 
Felipe (footballer, born February 1984) (Felipe Ventura dos Santos), Brazilian football goalkeeper
Felipe Azevedo dos Santos (born 1987), Brazilian football player
Filipe Francisco dos Santos (born 1987), Brazilian footballer
Felipe Santos (missing person) (born 1979), Mexico-born person who disappeared in 2003
Felipe Santos (water polo) (Felipe Santos da Costa e Silva, born 1984), Brazilian water polo player
Felipe Silva Correa dos Santos (born 1997), Brazilian footballer